The Crêt du Cervelet (1,307 m) is a mountain of the Jura, located between La Brévine and Couvet in the canton of Neuchâtel.

References

External links
Crêt du Cervelet on Hikr

Mountains of the Jura
Mountains of the canton of Neuchâtel
Mountains of Switzerland
One-thousanders of Switzerland